Toxiclionella impages is a species of sea snail, a marine gastropod mollusk in the family Clavatulidae.

Description
The shell grows to a length of 50 mm. The shell is flexuously, narrowly ribbed or plicate. The plicae extend to the suture, but not prominent. The color of the shell is yellowish brown.

Distribution
This marine species occurs off the Agulhas Bank, South Africa.

References

 Kilburn, R.N. (1985). Turridae (Mollusca: Gastropoda) of southern Africa and Mozambique. Part 2. Subfamily Clavatulinae. Ann. Natal Mus. 26(2), 417–470.

External links
 

Endemic fauna of South Africa
impages
Gastropods described in 1848